Rise & Shine is the thirteenth and final studio album by John Kay and Steppenwolf, released in 1990 under the label IRS Records.  It features "The Wall", John Kay's song celebrating the fall of the Berlin Wall, and "Rock 'N Roll War", Kay's homage to veterans of the Vietnam War.

Track listing

Side one
"Let's Do It All" (Kay, Ritchotte, Wilk) – 3:58
"Time Out" (Kay, Ritchotte, Wilk) – 3:46
"Do or Die" (Kay, Wilk) – 4:06
"Rise and Shine" (Kay, Wilk) – 4:05
"The Wall" (Kay, Ritchotte, Wilk) – 6:21
Side two
"The Daily Blues" (Kay, Ritchotte, Wilk) – 3:36
"Keep Rockin'" (Kay, Wilk) – 4:03
"Rock 'N Roll War" (Kay, Ritchotte, Wilk) – 7:06
"Sign on the Line" (Kay, Ritchotte, Wilk) – 3:45
"We Like It, We Love It (We Want More of It)" (Kay, Ritchotte, Wilk) – 4:06

Personnel

Steppenwolf
 John Kay – guitar, lead vocals
 Michael Wilk – keyboards, bass, programming
 Ronald "Rocket" Ritchotte – lead guitar, vocals
 Ron Hurst – drums, vocals

Technical
 John Kay, Michael Wilk, Rocket Ritchotte – producers
 Glenn Meadows – mastering
 Neil Zlozower – photography (back cover)
 John Taylor DisMukes – illustration (front cover)

References

1990 albums
Steppenwolf (band) albums
Albums produced by John Kay (musician)
Albums produced by Michael Wilk